Taleh Jerd-e Sofla (also Romanized as Taleh Jerd-e Soflá and Taleh Jerd Sofla; also known as Talah Jerd and Talehjerd-e Pa’in) is a village in Kamazan-e Sofla Rural District, Zand District, Malayer County, Hamadan Province, Iran. At the 2006 census, its population was 59, in 17 families.

References 

Populated places in Malayer County